Ernesto Vázquez Muñóz  (born 29 March 1989) is a Mexican footballer who plays for Potros UAEM.

Club career
Vázquez has played for Socio Águila in the Mexican Primera División A since 2008. América gana la final

References

1989 births
Living people
Mexican footballers
Liga MX players
Association football midfielders
Potros UAEM footballers
Alebrijes de Oaxaca players